The Moyle River is a river in the Northern Territory, Australia.

Course

An  floodplain region exists along Hyland Bay formed by the Moyle and Little Moyle River. The area is dominated by seasonally inundated grassland and sedgeland with areas of paperbark swamp. Mangroves are found along the stretches of the river, creeks and channels that are often backed by saline flats. The Anson Bay, Daly and Reynolds River Floodplains, an important bird area, is situated immediately to the north of the site.

Tom Turners Creek is the only tributary to the river.

The estuary formed at the river mouth is in near pristine condition with a tidal delta. It is river dominated in nature with a wave dominated delta having single channel and is surrounded by an area of  covered with mangroves.

Catchment

Fauna
A total of 25 species of fish are found in the river including; the Sailfin Glassfish, Barred Grunter, Sooty Grunter, Fly-specked Hardyhead, Empire Gudgeon, Northern Trout Gudgeon, Pennyfish, Barramundi, Oxeye Herring, Western Rainbowfish, Black-banded Rainbowfish, Bony Bream, Black Catfish, Short-finned Catfish, Seven-spot Archerfish and the Primitive Archerfish.

History
The traditional owners of the area are the Maringar, Nanggikorongo and the Magatige peoples. The river was named in the 1930s from a word in the Maringar language meaning 'plain' or 'plain country'.

See also

List of rivers of Northern Territory

References

Rivers of the Northern Territory